Hampton Park is one of the volcanoes in the Auckland volcanic field. The scoria cone sits in the centre of a much larger explosion crater, the eastern arc of the surrounding tuff ring is still present. Stone from the volcano was used to build dry-stone walls and the nearby St John's Church built on the tuff ring crest.

References

City of Volcanoes: A geology of Auckland - Searle, Ernest J.; revised by Mayhill, R.D.; Longman Paul, 1981. First published 1964. .
"Volcanoes of Auckland: The essential guide." - Bruce Hayward, Graeme Murdoch, Gordon Maitland; Auckland University Press, 2011.
Volcanoes of Auckland: A Field Guide. Hayward, B.W.; Auckland University Press, 2019, 335 pp. .

Auckland volcanic field